Agnes von Hohenstaufen is a German-language opera in three acts by the Italian composer Gaspare Spontini. The German libretto is by Ernst Benjamin Salomo Raupach. It was first staged at the Königliches Opernhaus, Berlin, on 12 June 1829. Raupach categorised Agnes von Hohenstaufen as a historical-romantic opera and it is one of a number of German works of the time set in the Middle Ages (others include Weber's Euryanthe, Wagner's Tannhäuser and Lohengrin and Schumann's Genoveva). Agnes also contains many of the features that would be characteristic of French Grand Opera. Spontini substantially reworked the piece for a revival in 1837.

Roles

Synopsis
Place: Germany
Time: The Middle Ages

Act 1
The action concerns the struggle between the Holy Roman Emperor Henry VI (Heinrich VI) and the leader of the noble Welf faction, Henry the Lion (Heinrich der Löwe). The first act is set in Mainz where the emperor has assembled his forces to march against the Welfs:

Agnes of Hohenstaufen, the emperor's cousin, is engaged to be married to the son of Henry the Lion, Henry "Palatinus", but the war brings this alliance into doubt. Henry arrives at Mainz disguised as a troubadour. The French ambassador proposes that Agnes should be married to his king, Philip II Augustus (Philipp August), instead. The emperor agrees and the betrothal is announced at a banquet. Henry, unable to bear the French ambassador's flirting with Agnes, is moved to anger and his true identity is revealed. The emperor condemns him to death and banishes Agnes to a convent. This highhandedness provokes a mutiny amongst some of the nobles.

Act 2
Henry is offered his life providing he renounces Agnes and goes into exile. He angrily rejects these terms just as the mutinous nobles burst in. Henry tries to escape in the confusion but is captured by the French ambassador, who proposes that they should fight a duel the next day. The emperor agrees but gives secret orders to have Henry killed during an escape bid. Henry does indeed manage to break out of prison and reach Agnes in church, where the two are quickly married. The French ambassador is furious and only the intervention of the archbishop prevents a duel in church.

Act 3
Henry and Agnes plan to flee to the army of Henry the Lion, but they are captured. Henry agrees to fight the duel with the French ambassador and mortally wounds him. He is revealed to be none other than King Philip Augustus himself, who had wanted to see his betrothed before the marriage. Irmengard, Agnes' mother, now announces that the wedding between Henry and her daughter has already taken place. The emperor is furious but he provokes another mutiny among the nobles. Henry unexpectedly draws his sword to defend the emperor's authority.

At this point Henry the Lion arrives in person to announce his army has taken Mainz, but he too offers his submission to the emperor. The dying French king pardons the young Henry. The emperor blesses the married couple and encourages his subjects to unite for an expedition to Italy.

Modern performances 
Although the original libretto is in German, only Italian-language versions of the opera have hitherto been recorded and filmed.

The opera was mounted at the Maggio Musicale Fiorentino in 1954 (in Italian) under Vittorio Gui, and again in 1974 with Leyla Gencer in the title role and Riccardo Muti conducting. For the first time since the 19th century the opera was heard in its original German (and with a recently unearthed overture) at Erfurt in June 2018 with Claudia Sorokina as Agnes and conducted by Zoi Tsokanou.

See also 
 Germania
 Günther von Schwarzburg
 Die Rheinnixen
 Lohengrin

References

Sources
Holden, Amanda (Ed.), The New Penguin Opera Guide, New York: Penguin Putnam, 2001.

External links 
 German libretto by Ernst Raupach.
 Agnese di Hohenstaufen, Italian version of the opera on YouTube.

Operas by Gaspare Spontini
German-language operas
1829 operas
Operas
Opera world premieres at the Berlin State Opera
German patriotic songs
Operas set in Germany